Rüdesheim is a Verbandsgemeinde ("collective municipality") in the district of Bad Kreuznach, Rhineland-Palatinate, Germany. The seat of the Verbandsgemeinde is in Rüdesheim an der Nahe.

The Verbandsgemeinde Rüdesheim consists of the following Ortsgemeinden ("local municipalities"):

 Allenfeld
 Argenschwang
 Bockenau
 Boos
 Braunweiler
 Burgsponheim
 Dalberg
 Duchroth
 Gebroth
 Gutenberg
 Hargesheim
 Hergenfeld
 Hüffelsheim
 Mandel
 Münchwald
 Niederhausen
 Norheim
 Oberhausen an der Nahe
 Oberstreit 
 Roxheim 
 Rüdesheim an der Nahe
 Sankt Katharinen 
 Schloßböckelheim 
 Sommerloch 
 Spabrücken 
 Spall 
 Sponheim 
 Traisen
 Waldböckelheim 
 Wallhausen
 Weinsheim 
 Winterbach 

Verbandsgemeinde in Rhineland-Palatinate